Huang Yi-ting (born 16 January 1990) is a Taiwanese competitive rower.

At the Olympic qualifying events in April 2016 she came first beating Mahsa Javar from Iran. 

She competed at the 2016 Summer Olympics in Rio de Janeiro, in the women's single sculls.

References

External links

1990 births
Living people
Taiwanese female rowers
Olympic rowers of Taiwan
Rowers at the 2016 Summer Olympics
Rowers at the 2020 Summer Olympics
Rowers at the 2018 Asian Games
Medalists at the 2018 Asian Games
Asian Games medalists in rowing
Asian Games silver medalists for Chinese Taipei
Fu Jen Catholic University alumni
21st-century Taiwanese women